Sámuel Egri is a Hungarian sprint canoer who competed in the mid-1960s. He won a bronze medal in the K-4 10000 m event at the 1963 ICF Canoe Sprint World Championships in Jajce.

References

Hungarian male canoeists
Living people
Year of birth missing (living people)
ICF Canoe Sprint World Championships medalists in kayak